Lim or LIM may refer to:

Name
 Lim (Korean surname), a common Korean surname
 Lim (Chinese surname), Hokkien, Hakka, Teochew and Hainanese spelling of the Chinese family name "Lin"
 Liza Lim (born 1966), Australian classical composer

Abbreviations
 Lanes in metres, a unit of measure for vehicle ferries
 LIM College (Laboratory Institute of Merchandising), New York City, US
 Linear induction motor
 Logical Information Machines, Chicago, US software company
 LIM domain, a protein-protein interaction domain
 Lotus-Intel-Microsoft, the alliance responsible for the Expanded Memory Specification (EMS)

Places
 IATA airport code for Jorge Chávez International Airport, Lima, Peru)
 Lim (Croatia), a bay and a valley
 Lim (river), in Montenegro, Albania, Bosnia and Herzegovina and Serbia
 Lim Island or Adır Island, Lake Van, Turkey
 Lim, Bắc Ninh, a township in Vietnam

Others
 A symbol for the limit (mathematics) operator
 Lim (musical instrument), a Bhutanese flute

See also
 Lympne (pronounced 'Lim'), a village in Kent, England